The 1995 Coupe de France Final was a football match held at Parc des Princes, Paris on May 13, 1995. Paris SG defeated RC Strasbourg 1-0 on a goal by Paul Le Guen.

Match details

See also
Coupe de France 1994-95

External links
Coupe de France results at Rec.Sport.Soccer Statistics Foundation
Report on French federation site

Coupe
1995
Coupe De France Final 1995
Coupe De France Final 1995
Coupe de France Final
Coupe de France Final